Klaus Dumke (born 14 February 1941) is a German fencer. He competed for East Germany in the individual and team épée events at the 1968 Summer Olympics.

References

1941 births
Living people
German male fencers
Olympic fencers of East Germany
Fencers at the 1968 Summer Olympics
Fencers from Berlin